Ole Petersen may refer to:

Ole Erik Petersen, 1960 Olympic Medal winner
Ole Holger Petersen, Director of Biosciences at Cardiff University and Fellow of the Royal Society
Ole Peter Petersen, founder of Methodism in Norway
Ole Petersen, 1961 German Author